Ibrahim al-Afghani, also known as Ibrahim Haji Jama Mee'aad, was a prominent member of Somalia's Al-Shabaab, an insurgent group fighting Somalia's Transitional Federal Government.

Afghani formerly held positions as the first deputy leader of Al-Shabaab and in charge of finance, and head of al-Shabaab's Kisimayo administration.

He was rumored to have been killed in a Predator drone attack on an al-Shabaab training camp south of Kismayo, Somalia on 25 June 2011, but he survived and was reported to have resigned from Al-Shabaab in December 2011.

In April 2013, a letter was circulated on extremist websites reportedly penned by Afghani to Al-Qaeda leader Ayman al-Zawahiri, criticising Godane's leadership. On 29 June 2013, al-Shabaab announced that they had killed Afghani during a gun battle on 20 June 2013 when he resisted arrest, but family members, including Afghani's sister, said that he had been arrested and then executed.

References

Assassinated Al-Shabaab members
2013 deaths
Year of birth missing
People from Lower Shebelle